Nelsjapyx is a genus of diplurans in the family Japygidae.

Species
 Nelsjapyx hichinsi Smith, 1962
 Nelsjapyx soldadi Smith, 1962

References

Diplura